The China Campaign Medal is a decoration of the United States Army which was created by order of the United States War Department on January 12, 1905.  The medal recognizes service in the China Relief Expedition which was conducted by the United States Army at the turn on the 20th century during the Boxer Rebellion.

Description and history

To be awarded the China Campaign Medal, a service member must have performed military duty in China, between the dates of June 20, 1900 and May 27, 1901, with such duty being in service of the China Relief Expedition.  For those service members who were cited for gallantry in action, the Citation Star is authorized as a device to the China Campaign Medal.

The United States Navy equivalent of the China Campaign Medal was the China Relief Expedition Medal.

Obverse
On the obverse is the Imperial Chinese five-toed dragon with the inscription CHINA RELIEF EXPEDITION around the upper border and the dates 1900–1901 at the bottom.

Reverse
On the reverse is a trophy composed of an eagle perched on a cannon supported by crossed flags, rifles, an Indian shield, spear and quiver of arrows, a Cuban machete, and a Sulu kris. Below the trophy are the words FOR SERVICE. Around the border at the top are the words UNITED STATES ARMY and around the bottom are thirteen stars.

Ribbon
The ribbon is 1 inches wide and is composed of the following vertical stripes: 1/16 inch Ultramarine blue, 1 inch Golden yellow, and 1/16 inch Ultramarine Blue.

Streamers
Army units which received credit for campaign participation may display the streamer on the organizational flag. The inscription will be as indicated on the unit's lineage and honors.

There are three streamers displayed on the Army flag to represent the China Relief Expedition. The inscriptions are:

TIENTSIN 1900
YANG-TSUN 1900
PEKING 1900

See also
List of military decorations
Awards and decorations of the United States military

References
This article incorporates text in the public domain from the United States Army.

United States campaign medals
Boxer Rebellion campaign medals
1905 establishments in the United States
Awards established in 1905